Tyler Gregory Gilbert (born December 22, 1993) is an American professional baseball pitcher in the Arizona Diamondbacks organization. He made his major league debut on August 3, 2021. In his first major league start, on August 14, 2021, Gilbert threw a no-hitter.

Early life
Gilbert was born on December 22, 1993 in Santa Cruz, California. He attended San Lorenzo Valley High School in Felton, California.

College career
After he graduated, Gilbert enrolled at Santa Barbara City College (SBCC), where he began his college baseball career with the SBCC Vaqueros. In 2013, his sophomore year, he pitched to a 9–2 win–loss record and a 2.43 earned run average (ERA). Gilbert was named the Western State Conference's pitcher of the year for the North Division. He was offered a scholarship from the University of Southern California (USC) and continued his college baseball career with the USC Trojans.

Professional career

Drafts and minor leagues
The Philadelphia Phillies selected Gilbert in the sixth round, with the 174th overall selection, of the 2015 Major League Baseball draft. He signed with the Phillies, who assigned him to the Williamsport Crosscutters of the Class A-Short Season New York-Penn League in 2015. Gilbert had a 4–3 win–loss record and a 2.79 ERA with Williamsport. He pitched for the Lakewood BlueClaws of the Class A South Atlantic League in 2016, and finished the season with a 7–9 win–loss record and a 3.98 ERA. In 2017, Gilbert pitched for the Clearwater Threshers of the Class A-Advanced Florida State League, and he pitched to a 2.95 ERA.

Gilbert began the 2018 season with the Reading Fightin Phils of the Class AA Eastern League. He had played as a starting pitcher until his promotion to Reading, when he became a relief pitcher. With Reading in 2018, Gilbert pitched to a 2.86 ERA. He received a midseason promotion to the Lehigh Valley IronPigs of the Class AAA International League. After the 2018 season, Gilbert pitched for the Tigres del Licey of the Dominican Professional Baseball League. Gilbert returned to Lehigh Valley in 2019, and pitched to a 2.83 ERA during the 2019 season.

On February 5, 2020, the Phillies traded Gilbert to the Los Angeles Dodgers for Kyle Garlick. He played for the Dodgers during spring training in 2020 before the cancellation of the 2020 minor league season due to the COVID-19 pandemic.

The Arizona Diamondbacks selected Gilbert from the Dodgers organization in the minor league phase of the Rule 5 draft after the 2020 season. He began the 2021 season with the Reno Aces of Triple-A West, and pitched to a 5–2 win–loss record and a 3.44 ERA with 50 strikeouts.

Arizona Diamondbacks (2021–2022)
The Diamondbacks promoted Gilbert to the major leagues on August 3. He made his major league debut that night, throwing an inning as a relief pitcher without allowing a run.

On August 14, 2021, Gilbert, making his first major league start, threw a no-hitter in a 7–0 Diamondbacks win against the San Diego Padres at Chase Field. He struck out five batters, walked three and threw 64 of 102 pitches for strikes. Gilbert became the fourth pitcher to throw a no-hitter in his first major league start, and the first since Bobo Holloman in 1953. It was the third no-hitter in Diamondbacks history, the first since Edwin Jackson's no-hitter in 2010, and the first at Chase Field. His no-hitter was also the eighth of the MLB season, tying the single-season record set in 1884. He finished the 2021 season with a 2–2 record and a 3.15 ERA.

On December 15, 2022, Gilbert was designated for assignment. He cleared waivers and was sent outright to Triple-A on December 23, 2022.

Personal life
Tyler Gilbert was born to parents Greg and Peggy Martin Gilbert in Santa Cruz County, California. Following the cancellation of the 2020 minor league season, Gilbert worked alongside his father as an electrician. He is dating Caitlin Akeman.

See also
List of Major League Baseball no-hitters
Rule 5 draft results

References

External links

USC Trojans bio

1993 births
Living people
Sportspeople from Santa Cruz, California
Baseball players from California
Major League Baseball pitchers
Arizona Diamondbacks players
Santa Barbara City Vaqueros baseball players
USC Trojans baseball players
Williamsport Crosscutters players
Lakewood BlueClaws players
Clearwater Threshers players
Reading Fightin Phils players
Lehigh Valley IronPigs players
Tigres del Licey players
American expatriate baseball players in the Dominican Republic
Reno Aces players